Atle Pedersen (born 27 July 1964) is a Norwegian former professional racing cyclist. He won the Norwegian National Road Race Championship in 1985 and 1986. He also competed in the road race at the 1988 Summer Olympics.

References

External links
 

1964 births
Living people
Norwegian male cyclists
People from Larvik
Norwegian Vuelta a España stage winners
Cyclists at the 1988 Summer Olympics
Olympic cyclists of Norway
Sportspeople from Vestfold og Telemark
20th-century Norwegian people